This is the complete list of Asian Games medalists in paragliding in 2018.

Men

Individual accuracy

Team accuracy

Team cross-country

Women

Individual accuracy

Team accuracy

Team cross-country

References 

Paragliding
medalists